The Marquette Building, also known as the Boatmen's Bank Building, is a historical building in downtown St. Louis.

It was completed in 1914 at Broadway and Olive Streets, at 19 stories, designed by the St. Louis architecture partnership of Eames and Young. The building stands at 20 stories with a 2-story penthouse atop the 20th floor. A 1915 Annex, also designed by Eames and Young, was razed in 1998.  The Marquette Building was added to the National Register of Historic Places the same year, and was redeveloped for condos in 2007. The building roof sports a small pool atop the eastern wing and a dog park/ relief area on the western wing, that are available to building residents.

References

  Emporis entry on the Marquette Building
 photos from Built St. Louis

Commercial buildings completed in 1914
Buildings and structures in St. Louis
Commercial buildings on the National Register of Historic Places in Missouri
National Register of Historic Places in St. Louis
Downtown St. Louis
1914 establishments in Missouri